Donald Maynard Hultstrand (April 16, 1927 - December 21, 2018) was  the ninth bishop of the Episcopal Diocese of Springfield.

Early and family life

Born on April 16, 1927, in Parkers Prairie, Minnesota, to Aaron Hultstrand and his wife, the former Selma Liljegren. Hultstrand graduated from Macalester College in 1950 and Bexley Hall Seminary in 1953. He received a M.Div. from Bexley in 1972 and a Doctor of Divinity degrees from Nashotah House in 1986. He was a member of Pi Phi Epsilon.

He married Marjorie Ann Richter in June 1948.

Ministry

He was ordained to the diaconate on June 14, 1953, by Bishop Kellogg, and to the priesthood on December 19, 1953, by Bishop Keeler. He was consecrated on February 6, 1982, and served a decade as bishop of Springfield, Illinois.

Hulstrand served several churches in Minnesota—initially as a vicar at St. John's in Worthington and Trinity in Luverne before becoming the diocesan youth advisor (1955–57) then rector in Wabasha (1957–61) and an instructor at the Brent School in Minneapolis (1961–62) and rector of St. Paul in Duluth (1969–75). He also served as rector of St. Mark's in Canton 1962–68, and was an honorary canon at Trinity Cathedral in Cleveland (1966–69), then accepted a call as an Associate at St. Andrews in Kansas City, Missouri 1(968-69). Immediately before his episcopate, Hulstrand was rector in Greeley, Colorado (1979-1982). He was Executive Director of the Anglican Fellowship of Prayer and President of the Living Church foundation beginning in 1992. Before his episcopate, Hultstrand received the Distinguished Service award from Young Life Minnesota (1974), and served on the board directors for Senior Citizens Housing in Duluth] (1972—1975) and for St. Luke's Hospital in Duluth (1969—1975). He was the president of the Low-Rent Housing Project in Greeley (1979—1982).

His published books and cassettes include: God Shall Wipe Away All Tears, Revelations of Effective Prayer, Life in the Spirit, Holy Living Today and The Praying Church.

In retirement, he was affiliated with Christ Episcopal Church in Greenville, South Carolina.

See also 
List of bishops of the Episcopal Church in the United States of America
List of Macalester College people

References 

Episcopal bishops of Minnesota
Macalester College alumni
People from Springfield, Illinois
Place of birth missing
1927 births
2018 deaths
20th-century American Episcopalians
Episcopal bishops of Springfield